The Wicked Lady is a 1983 British-American drama film directed by Michael Winner and starring Faye Dunaway, Alan Bates, John Gielgud, Denholm Elliott, and Hugh Millais. It was screened out of competition at the 1983 Cannes Film Festival. It is a remake of the  1945 film of the same name, which was one of the popular series of Gainsborough melodramas.

Plot 
Caroline is to be wed to Sir Ralph and invites her sister Barbara to be her bridesmaid. Barbara seduces Ralph, and marries him herself, but, despite her new wealthy situation, she gets bored and turns to highway robbery for thrills.

While on the road she meets a famous highwayman, Jerry Jackson, and they continue as a team, but some people begin suspecting her identity and she risks death if she continues her nefarious activities.

Cast 

 Faye Dunaway as Lady Barbara Skelton
 Alan Bates as Jerry Jackson
 John Gielgud as Hogarth
 Denholm Elliott as Sir Ralph Skelton
 Prunella Scales as Lady Kingsclere
 Oliver Tobias as Kit Locksby
 Glynis Barber as Caroline
 Joan Hickson as Aunt Agatha
 Helena McCarthy as Moll Skelton
 Mollie Maureen as Doll Skelton
 Derek Francis as Lord Kingsclere
 Marina Sirtis as Jackson's Girl
 Nicholas Gecks as Ned Cotterell
 Hugh Millais as Uncle Martin
 John Savident as Squire Thornton
 Marc Sinden as Lord Dolman
 Mark Burns as King Charles II

Production

Development
Michael Winner bought the rights from the Rank Organisation and took the film to Faye Dunaway, who agreed to star in the leading role. Winner then raised finance from the Cannon Group in February 1982.

In March John Gielgud and Alan Bates agreed to star and the budget was set at $15 million. Winner called the film "Bonnie and Clyde in the 17th century."

In May Dunaway also announced she would make a second film for Cannon, Duet for One which would be directed by her then-boyfriend Terry O'Neill along with Dede Allen.

Menahem Golan of Cannon said that "stars who would never have worked with us before are now happy to sign. We pay them peanuts - but we give them big percentages. Faye, Alan and John were happy to sign for The Wicked Lady because they have 50% of the film. And we have small overheads, so they'll get their money." Dunaway said, "I really feel it will be a fun picture. A period romp, it's a mixture between Bonnie and Clyde and Tom Jones."

Shooting
"This is the only film I've ever enjoyed making," said Dunaway on set. "Everything I've done in the past has been so full of anguish,  though that's partly my fault, I'm sure." She said the film "came at the right time for me. I needed something light after making Mommie Dearest, which was decidedly harrowing."

The actor Mark Burns appeared in The Wicked Lady as King Charles II, but during the filming director Michael Winner could not afford to pay him even the Equity union minimum fee. Burns told him to make a donation to the Police Memorial Trust, which was run by Winner. Years later, when Burns appeared at a magistrate's court on a charge of speeding, Winner, appearing as a character witness, told the bench that the actor had given "his entire fee" for a major film to the fund and Burns was subsequently discharged.

Censorship
The film included a scene where Faye Dunaway's character has a whip fight with Jackson's Girl (Marina Sirtis). The British censor insisted this scene be cut before the film was given an X certificate. Winner got various colleagues to watch the film and write letters of protest to the censor in support of the film and the scene. These included Derek Malcolm, Kingsley Amis, Lindsay Anderson, and Fay Weldon. Winner's appeal was successful and the film was released uncut.

Reception
The film received a Razzie Award nomination for Faye Dunaway as Worst Actress.

Soundtrack
The soundtrack for the film was composed by Genesis keyboardist Tony Banks.

References

External links

The Wicked Lady at Letterbox DVD
The Wicked Lady at BFI

1983 films
1980s adventure drama films
American adventure drama films
British adventure drama films
1980s English-language films
Films directed by Michael Winner
Films set in the 17th century
Metro-Goldwyn-Mayer films
Golan-Globus films
United Artists films
1983 drama films
Cultural depictions of Charles II of England
Films with screenplays by Michael Winner
Films about highwaymen
Films produced by Menahem Golan
Films produced by Yoram Globus
1980s American films
1980s British films